The Grace of God is a Canadian docudrama film, directed by Gerald L'Ecuyer and released in 1998. Centering on L'Ecuyer's identity as a gay man, the film unfolds as a series of vignettes depicting various key moments in his life, acted by a cast that includes Michael Riley, Steve Cumyn, Robbie Pennant, Alanna Cavanagh, David Bolt and David Cronenberg.

The film won the award for Best Canadian Film at the 1998 Inside Out Film and Video Festival.

References

External links
 

1998 films
Canadian docudrama films
Canadian LGBT-related films
Documentary films about gay men
1998 LGBT-related films
1998 documentary films
1990s English-language films
1990s Canadian films